Antambohobe is a town and commune in Madagascar. It belongs to the district of Ivohibe, which is a part of Ihorombe Region. The population of the commune was estimated to be approximately 9,000 in the 2001 commune census.

Only primary schooling is available. Most of the inhabitants (75%) receive their support from agriculture; 24.4% of the inhabitants receive their support from raising livestock. Fishing supports 0.4% of the population; services provide employment for the remainder (0.2%). The most important crop is rice; other significant products are sugarcane, beans, maize and cassava.

It is connected with Ihosy in the west, and Farafangana in the east by the largely unpaved Route nationale 27.

See also
Pic d'Ivohibe Reserve and the Andringitra National Park that are nearby

References and notes

Populated places in Ihorombe